Traveler is an album by Trey Anastasio released on October 16, 2012.

Track listing

Let Me Lie appears on Anastasio's 2006 album Bar 17 as well as Phish's 2009 album Party Time, a complete, complementary album released with Joy in a boxed set.

Members of The National, who have worked closely with album producer Peter Katis, also contributed to the record.
Clint Eastwood is a cover of the Gorillaz song of the same name.

Commercial reception

The album debuted at  No. 51 on the Billboard 200 albums chart on its release, selling around 7,000 copies in the United States in its first week. It also debuted at No. 22 on Billboard's Top Rock Albums, and No. 16 on the Alternative Albums chart. The album has sold 18,000 copies in the United States as of September 2015.

Credits
 Produced by Peter Katis and Trey Anastasio
 Recorded and mixed by Peter Katis at Tarquin Studios

References

External links
Trey Anastasio's Official Website'

2012 albums
Trey Anastasio albums